The bombing of Cabra (7 November, 1938) was a aerial bombing raid on the town of Cabra, Andalusia during the Spanish Civil War. The air raid carried out by the Republican faction killed 109 civilians and wounded more than 200.

Background

Throughout 1938, the Spanish Republican Air Force (Fuerza Aerea de la República Española, FARE) carried out air bombings against Nationalist-held cities (among them Seville and Valladolid) in retaliation for the bombing of Republican held cities such as Barcelona, Alicante and Granollers.

The attacks

On 7 November 1938, three Tupolev SB bombers of the FARE, bombed the town of Cabra, in the province of Córdoba. One of the  bombs fell on the town's market, killing dozens of civilians. The aircraft dropped six tons of bombs. Most of the bombs exploded in the market and in the working class districts. There were between 101 and 109 civilians dead and 200 wounded. The Nationalist anti-aircraft artillery was taken by surprise and reacted too late. The airstrike was carried out in the mistaken belief that Italian mechanized troops were stationed in the village. Once over the target, the pilots mistook the market's awnings for military tents.

Aftermath

The bombing of Cabra was the deadliest bombing carried out by the Republican air force during the war.

See also 

 Bombing of Guernica
List of aircraft of the Spanish Republican Air Force

References

Explosions in 1938
Mass murder in 1938
1938 in Spain
Conflicts in 1938
Strategic bombing operations and battles
Spanish Civil War massacres
Airstrikes during the Spanish Civil War
November 1938 events
Airstrikes conducted by Spain